The Cavan Minor Football Championship is an annual Gaelic Athletic Association club competition between Minor Cavan Gaelic football clubs. It was first competed for in 1935. Arva won the first Minor championship. Cavan Gaels hold the most titles at 16 including 7 in a row between 1998 and 2004.

Top winners

Roll of honour

References

External links
 Cavan at ClubGAA
 Official Cavan GAA Website

Cavan GAA Football championships